West Cambridge, also known as "Area 10", is a neighborhood in Cambridge, Massachusetts. It is bounded by the Charles River on the south, JFK Street on the east, Concord Avenue on the north, and Fresh Pond, Aberdeen Avenue, and the Watertown line on the west.

In 2005 it had a population of 8,266 residents living in 3,887 households, and the average household income was $80,746.

The racial demographics in 2000 were 86.5% White, 5.9% Asian/Pacific Islander, 4.1% Black, 3.7% Hispanic origin, 0.1% Native American, 1.0% other race.

References

Further reading
 On the Avenue, Huron Avenue, Cambridge Historical Commission
 Neighborhood Ten - Neighborhood Study

Neighborhoods in Cambridge, Massachusetts